Uzbekistan compete at the 2009 World Championships in Athletics from 15–23 August. A team of 6 athletes was announced for the competition.

Team selection

Track and road events

Field and combined events

Results

Men

Field events

Women
Track and road events

Field and combined events

External links
Official competition website

Nations at the 2009 World Championships in Athletics
World Championships in Athletics
Uzbekistan at the World Championships in Athletics